The 1970 United States Senate election in Montana took place on November 3, 1970. Incumbent U.S. Senator Mike Mansfield, the sitting Senate majority leader who was first elected to the Senate in 1952 and was re-elected in 1958 and 1964, ran for re-election. Mansfield won the Democratic primary against several opponents, and advanced to the general election, where he was opposed by Harold E. Wallace, a sporting goods salesman and the Republican nominee. While his margin of victory decreased slightly from 1964, Mansfield still managed to defeat Wallace in a landslide, winning his fourth and final term in the Senate.

Democratic primary

Candidates
Mike Mansfield, incumbent United States Senator
Tom McDonald
John W. Lawlor, rancher

Results

Republican primary

Candidates
Harold E. Wallace, sporting goods salesman

Results

General election

Results

See also 
 United States Senate elections, 1970

References

Montana
1970
1970 Montana elections